The 2010–11 Inter-Provincial Limited Over Tournament will be the third season of the official Limited overs domestic cricket competition in Sri Lanka. It will be a shorter tournament compared to the previous one with only 13 matches, and all group matches being held at the Sinhalese Sports Club Ground and all three finals at the newly upgraded R. Premadasa Stadium also in Colombo. This edition featured the Uva cricket team's debut in the limited overs tournament of the Inter-Provincial Cricket Tournament, having previously featured in the Inter-Provincial First Class Tournament. This season also saw the introduction of the Basnahira cricket team with the merger of Basnahira North and Basnahira South cricket teams. It will be the first time that the five teams represent five different provinces in the tournament.

This season comprised ten regular matches, two semifinals and a grand final.

Teams

Stadiums

Rules and regulations 

Teams received 4 points for a win, 2 for a tie or no result, and 0 for a loss. At the end of the regular matches the teams ranked two and three play each other in the preliminary final. The winner of the preliminary final earns the right to play the first placed team in the final at the home venue of the first placed team. In the event of several teams finishing with the same number of points, standings are determined by most wins, then net run rate (NRR).

Standings and tournament progression

Standings 

Full table on cricinfo
<div style="font-size:95%">(C) = Eventual Champion; (R) = Runner-up.

Tournament progression

Fixtures

Round 1  

Uva receives a bye for this round.

Round 2  

Ruhuna receives a bye for this round.

Round 3  

Basnahira receives a bye for this round.

Round 4  

Wayamba receives a bye for this round.

Round 5  

Kandurata receives a bye for this round.

Knockout stage

Semi Final 1

Semi Final 2

Final

Statistics

Awards 
 Man of the Tournament – Kumar Sangakkara: 268 runs (351 balls), highest score of 84 (93 balls) (Kandurata)
 Batsman of the Tournament – Kumar Sangakkara: 268 runs (351 balls), highest score of 84 (93 balls) (Kandurata)
 Bowler of the Tournament – Chanaka Welegedara: 10 wickets (35.5 overs), best innings bowling of 4/50 (9.1 overs) (Wayamba)

Most Runs 
The top five highest run scorers (total runs) in the season are included in this table.

Last Updated 28 January 2011.

Most Wickets 
The following table contains the five leading wicket-takers of the season.

Last Updated 28 January 2011.

Highest Team Totals 
The following table lists the six highest team scores during this season.

Last Updated 28 January 2011.

Highest Scores 
This table contains the top five highest scores of the season made by a batsman in a single innings.

Last Updated 28 January 2011.

Best Bowling Figures 
This table lists the top five players with the best bowling figures in the season.

Last Updated 28 January 2011.

References

Notes

External links 
 Tournament Page – Cricinfo
 CricketArchive

2011 in Sri Lankan cricket
Sri Lankan domestic cricket competitions
Inter-Provincial Limited Over Tournament